Giovanni Spagnolli (26 October 1907 – 5 October 1984) was an Italian Christian Democrat politician.

Biography

Early life and education
He was born on 26 October 1907 in Rovereto, a city in the Austro-Hungarian Tyrol at the time. He began his high school studies at the Imperial Regio Ginnasio in Rovereto. Refugee with his family (originally from Isera) in Dornbirn, in Vorarlberg during the Great War, he returned to his city after 1918, to complete his studies there until the end of high school.

At 19, he chose Milan for the university, convinced that this "leap from the province" could benefit his future: he earned two degrees, and Agostino Gemelli retained him as Administrative Deputy Secretary of the Catholic University of the Sacred Heart. 

The Feltrinelli Legnami company, with many contacts in Trentino, called him in turn as administrator. During the years of the Resistance, he worked in Brianza and Milan to shake consciences and organize the ranks of the new party of the Christian Democrats, of which he became the Milanese secretary. He collaborated from Rome in the reconstruction of Italy through UNRRA-CAASAS plans to give new homes to millions of homeless.

Political career
From 1953 for 23 years he was a member of parliament in the Constituency of Rovereto. He was undersecretary of foreign trade from July 1958 to March 1960; Minister of the Merchant Marine from December 1963 to February 1966 and from June to December 1968. From February 1966 to June 1968 he was Minister of Post and Teleommunications.

From 1973 to 1976 he held the position of President of the Senate (the first Alpine in that position). He left his political life in 1976 to deal with the Italian Alpine Club, of which he was president from 1971 to 1980, and with the problems of international volunteering.

Death
He died of a stroke in 1984.

References

External links

1907 births
1984 deaths
People from Trentino
Christian Democracy (Italy) politicians
Presidents of the Italian Senate
Senators of Legislature II of Italy
Senators of Legislature III of Italy
Senators of Legislature IV of Italy
Senators of Legislature V of Italy
Senators of Legislature VI of Italy
Politicians of Trentino-Alto Adige/Südtirol
Università Cattolica del Sacro Cuore alumni
Italian resistance movement members